Secret Garden is a 2010 South Korean television drama starring Ha Ji-won, Hyun Bin, Yoon Sang-hyun, and Kim Sa-rang. It aired on SBS from November 13, 2010 to January 16, 2011 on Saturdays and Sundays at 22:00 for 20 episodes.

The drama received positive response from critics and audience for its story, comedy, performance of cast especially of leads Hyun Bin, Yoon Sang-hyun and Ha Ji-won and production values. Secret Garden was a huge ratings success, with an estimation of more than 20 billion won worth of economic effect. Hyun Bin's portrayal as Kim Joo-won created a "Hyun Bin Syndrome" as his name and face were plastered everywhere, from newspapers to television and the internet. It won a number of awards at both the 2010 SBS Drama Awards and the 47th Baeksang Arts Awards, including "Grand Prize (Daesang)" for Hyun Bin.

Synopsis
A rationalizing Cinderella story between Gil Ra-im (Ha Ji-won), a stuntwoman, and Kim Joo-won (Hyun Bin), a high-end department store CEO. 
While trying to resolve a scandal involving Joo-won's cousin, Oska (Yoon Sang-hyun), (a famous singer), Ra-im and Joo-won meet and he finds himself stunned by her coolness. Joo-won does not understand why Ra-im is constantly on her mind, and decides to pursue her. Though she initially is repelled by him, Ra-im gradually starts reciprocating his feelings.

As two different worlds collide, Ra-im and Joo-won gradually learn about each other's worlds. Joo-won's mother does not want them to love each other. Despite his mother's objections, they get married. 

Meanwhile, Oska reunites with his first love, Yoon Seul (Kim Sa-rang), who has made a successful directing career for herself. However, Yoon Seul wants nothing to do with Oska, and instead has her eyes set on Joo-won. The story gets even more complicated and when Ra-im and Joo-won magically start switching bodies.

Cast

Main
Ha Ji-won as Gil Ra-im
 Tough but secretly lonely, Gil Ra-im works as a stunt woman for an action school that is run by director Im Jong-soo. Due to her father's death when she was in high school, she works hard and doesn't like relying on other people. Her one obsession is Oska, a famous Hallyu star. She meets the arrogant CEO, Kim Joo-won and although she initially dislikes him, their body swap brings about confusing feelings.

Hyun Bin as Kim Joo-won
 The CEO of a high-end departmental store, he is good-looking but arrogant. A childhood trauma caused him to have a defective memory and claustrophobia, causing him to be unable to take lifts. As a rational person, he always seeks answers and solutions to explain things that happen to him. When he meets the spunky Gil Ra-im, he is left confused as he does not understand why she is constantly on his mind. He also finds it hard to accept that she does not seem to care about him or what he is going through because of her.

Yoon Sang-hyun as Choi Woo-young (Oska) 
 A famous Hallyu star who is slowly losing his popularity. He is Joo-won's cousin, as well as the first love of Yoon Seul. Frivolous and free-spirited, Oska used to rely on his charming looks and money, but seeing Seul again and discovering new talent in a young man named Tae-sun triggers something inside him, causing him to change.

Kim Sa-rang as Yoon Seul
 Oska's first love. She is a music video director. Unable to forgive Oska, she is bent on making him hurt as much as possible. However nearing the end of the series, they decided to give each other a chance to make dreams happen.

Supporting
Lee Phillip as Im Jong-soo
The director of an action school. Having studied abroad, Im Jong-soo speaks English fluently and is well connected with Hollywood. Despite his gruff and rough exterior, he cares about his stunt actors deeply and looks out for them. He holds a soft spot for Ra-im, who is oblivious to his feelings.

Lee Jong-suk as Han Tae-sun
A young genius musician discovered by Oska in Jeju Island. Prickly and cold, he initially rebuffs Oska's attempts to recruit him. It is later revealed that he is gay and Oska becomes his muse.

Yoo In-na as Im Ah-young
Ra-im's best friend who shares a loft with her. She works at the department store Joo-won owns.

Kim Sung-oh as Secretary Kim
Joo-won's long-suffering assistant who has a crush on Im Ah-young.

Park Joon-geum as Moon Boon-hong
Joo-won's mother.

Kim Ji-sook as Moon Yeon-hong 
Oska's mother.

Choi Yoon-so as Kim Hee-won
Joo-won's sister who has a crush on Jong-soo.

Kim Sang-kyum as Moon Chang-soo
Joo-won's grandfather. Chairman of Loel Department Store.

Lee Byung-joon as Park Bong-ho
Joo-won's subordinate as well as great grand uncle. He aims to overthrow Joo-won as president and take over his position.

Sung Byung-sook as Park Bong-hee
Moon Chang-soo's fourth wife, Park Bong-ho's sister.

Yoon Ki-won as Choi Dong-kyu
Oska's long-suffering manager.

Kim Gun as Yoo Jong-hun
Oska's assistant.

Yoo Seo-jin as Park Ji-hyun
Joo-won's psychiatrist and long-term friend.

Jang Seo-won as Hwang Jung-hwan
Ra-im's senior (sunbae) at the action school.

Choi Dae-sung as Department Head Choi
Park Bong-ho's assistant.

Moon Woong-ki as Sang-min
Member of action school.

Special appearance
Jung In-gi as Ra-im's father
Baek Seung-hee as Park Chae-rin, an actress that Oska was involved with 
Ryu Sung-hoon as Gangster 
 Jo Jae-yoon as Photographer (Ep. 3)
Kim Mi-kyung as Owner of Restaurant in Mountain 
Hwang Seok-jeong as Korean dry sauna owner
Lee Joon-hyuk as Joon-hyuk, Oska's frenemy who has a one-sided love for Yoon Seul 
Yum Dong-hun as pervert in department store 
Heo Tae-hee as rude party guest
Baek Ji-young as herself 
Kim Ye-won as actress in Oska's music video 
Son Ye-jin as herself 
Song Yoon-ah as Top Star in giveaway event 
Song Jae-rim as singer

Original soundtrack

Ratings
In the tables below, the blue numbers represent the lowest ratings and the red numbers represent the highest ratings.

It aired on GMA Network from May 2, 2011 to July 29, 2011, on weeknights at 10:00 PM PST. Each episode runs 45 minutes including commercial breaks. The entire series was dubbed in Filipino.

Awards and nominations

Remake
Big Bang made a parody based on this drama with the title Secret Big Bang, starring by G-Dragon as Ji Ra-im and T.O.P as Kim Joo-tap.

In China, a film remake with the same title is released in 2012 starring Wallace Chung, Tan Weiwei and Korean singer Kangta.

In Thailand, a remake with the title Secret Garden Thailand is released in 2016 starring Ananda Everingham and Pimchanok Luevisadpaibul.

References

External links 
  
 
 

Seoul Broadcasting System television dramas
2010 South Korean television series debuts
2011 South Korean television series endings
Korean-language television shows
South Korean romantic fantasy television series
South Korean LGBT-related television shows
South Korean television series remade in other languages
Television shows written by Kim Eun-sook
Television series by Hwa&Dam Pictures
Fiction about body swapping